The 1928 Campeonato Paulista was the 27th season of São Paulo's top association football league. Two championships were disputed that season, each by a different league (APEA and LAF).

APEA Championship

In the edition organized by the APEA (Associação Paulista de Esportes Atléticos), Corinthians won the title for the 6th time. no teams were relegated and the top scorer was Heitor with 16 goals.

System
The championship was disputed in a double round-robin system, with the team with the most points winning the title.

Championship

LAF Championship

In the edition organized by the LAF (Liga dos Amadores de Futebol), SC Internacional won the title for the 2nd time. no teams were relegated and the top scorer was Friedenreich with 29 goals.

System
The championship was disputed in a double round-robin system, with the team with the most points winning the title.

Championship

References

Campeonato Paulista seasons
Paulista